Twice Upon a Time may refer to:

Film and television
Twice Upon a Time (1953 film), a British comedy film
Twice Upon a Time (1983 film), an American animated film
Twice Upon a Time (1998 film), an American fantasy/romantic comedy TV film
"Twice Upon a Time" (Doctor Who), a 2017 episode of Doctor Who
 Il était une seconde fois, a French TV series released in English as Twice Upon a Time

Music
Twice Upon a Time (Joe Diffie album)
Twice Upon a Time (The Kingston Trio album)
Twice Upon a Time: The Singles, an album by Siouxsie and the Banshees

Other uses
Twice Upon a Time (book series), a children's fantasy novel series by Wendy Mass